NBI may refer to:
NBI (narrow body implant), or Mini dental implant
Nemzeti Bajnokság I
Nicolas Berggruen Institute
Niels Bohr Institute
NBI (bank), a state-run Icelandic bank
Nation Brands Index
Nathaniel Branden Institute
National Bridge Inventory
National Bureau of Investigation (disambiguation)
National Bureau of Investigation (Finland)
National Bureau of Investigation (Philippines)
National Bureau of Investigation (Ukraine)
Network Bootable Image
Neutral Beam Injection
Nile Basin Initiative
Northbound interface
National Broadband Ireland, a telecommunications company